William Sheppard was an English portrait-painter.

Life 
William Sheppard was an artist of some merit, who appears to have followed the fortunes of Thomas Killigrew, the poet and dramatist, for there are numerous versions of a portrait of Killigrew, which is stated to have been painted by Sheppard in 1650 at Venice. One of these entered the collection of the Duke of Bedford at Woburn Abbey; another entered that of the Earl of Kimberley. This portrait was finely engraved by William Faithorne the Elder. 

Sheppard appears to have returned to London at the Restoration, and to have lived near the Royal Exchange. It is stated that he eventually retired to live in Yorkshire. The artist, Francis Barlow, was his pupil.

References

Citations

Bibliography 

 Blackett-Ord, Carol (2004). "Sheppard, William (fl. 1641–1660)". In Oxford Dictionary of National Biography. Oxford: Oxford University Press.
  

Year of birth missing
Year of death missing
17th-century English painters
English portrait painters